The 4 arrondissements of the Finistère department are:
 Arrondissement of Brest, (subprefecture: Brest) with 77 communes.  The population of the arrondissement was 374,276 in 2016.  
 Arrondissement of Châteaulin, (subprefecture: Châteaulin) with 57 communes. The population of the arrondissement was 82,403 in 2016.  
 Arrondissement of Morlaix, (subprefecture: Morlaix) with 59 communes. The population of the arrondissement was 128,830 in 2016.  
 Arrondissement of Quimper, (prefecture of the Finistère department: Quimper) with 84 communes. The population of the arrondissement was 322,740 in 2016.

History

In 1800 the arrondissements of Quimper, Brest, Châteaulin, Morlaix and Quimperlé were established. The arrondissement of Quimperlé was disbanded in 1926. 

The borders of the arrondissements of Finistère were modified in January 2017:
 one commune from the arrondissement of Brest to the arrondissement of Morlaix
 three communes from the arrondissement of Châteaulin to the arrondissement of Quimper

References

Finistere